Big Brum is the local name for the clock tower on the Council House, Birmingham, England. Built in 1885, the clock tower  is part of the first extension to the original Council House of 1879 and stands above the Museum & Art Gallery. The clock tower, Museum & Art Gallery and Council House were designed by architect Yeoville Thomason and form a single block. The clock was donated by Follett Osler, a local pioneer in the measurement of meteorological and chronological data. The clock mechanism was supplied by Gillet & Co. of Croydon, and the clock-tower and lofty entrance portico were considered the "most conspicuous features" of the exterior upon opening.

The name alludes to the clock tower of the Palace of Westminster which houses the bell Big Ben, and the Birmingham clock tower bell also rings with Westminster Chimes. "Brum" is the local term for the town, the people and the dialect, and the name "Big Brum" can refer to either the clock, the tower or the bell.

References

External links
Birmingham Libraries Collection - Victoria Square and the Council House - 1912

Buildings and structures in Birmingham, West Midlands
Clock towers in the United Kingdom
Individual clocks in England
Towers in the West Midlands (county)
Towers completed in 1885